City of My Dreams is a 1976 Swedish historical drama film directed by Ingvar Skogsberg and based on the book with the same name, written by Per Anders Fogelström. It was screened at the 1978 San Francisco International Film Festival. The film was selected as the Swedish entry for the Best Foreign Language Film at the 49th Academy Awards, but was not accepted as a nominee.

Cast
 Eddie Axberg as Henning Nilsson
 Britt-Louise Tillbom as Lotten Blom
 Kjell-Hugo Grandin as Tummen
 Gunilla Larsson as Matilda
 Åke Wästersjö as Skräcken
 Märta Dorff as Johanna
 Berit Gustafsson as Malin
 Peter Lindgren as Storsäcken
 Fylgia Zadig as Storsäcken's Wife
 Mona Seilitz as Storsäcken's Daughter

See also
 List of submissions to the 49th Academy Awards for Best Foreign Language Film
 List of Swedish submissions for the Academy Award for Best International Feature Film

References

External links
 
 

1976 films
1970s Swedish-language films
1976 drama films
Films directed by Ingvar Skogsberg
Films scored by Björn Isfält
Films set in the 19th century
1970s historical drama films
Swedish historical drama films
Films set in Stockholm
1970s Swedish films